is a Japanese skateboarder. At the 2020 Summer Olympics, she won the first ever gold medal in the women's street competition. Winning it at 13, she is the youngest person ever to win a gold medal for Japan, and third youngest after Marjorie Gestring and Klaus Zerta to ever win an event at the Summer Olympics.

Career
Nishiya competed at the 2019 Summer X Games in the women's street event where she scored 90.00 and won a silver medal.

Nishiya competed at the 2021 Street Skateboarding World Championships where she scored 14.17 and won the silver medal.

As of June 2021, Nishiya was ranked fifth in the Olympic World Skateboarding rankings, and qualified for the 2020 Summer Olympics. She competed in the women's street competition, where she scored 15.26 and won the gold medal. At the age of 13 years and 330 days, she became the youngest Olympic gold medalist for Japan, and the third youngest gold medalist in Olympic history.

References 

2007 births
Living people
Female skateboarders
Japanese skateboarders
Medalists at the 2020 Summer Olympics
Olympic gold medalists for Japan
Olympic medalists in skateboarding
Olympic skateboarders of Japan
Skateboarders at the 2020 Summer Olympics
Sportspeople from Osaka
X Games athletes
21st-century Japanese women